The Nabawan District is an administrative district in the Malaysian state of Sabah, part of the Interior Division which includes the districts of Beaufort, Keningau, Kuala Penyu, Nabawan, Sipitang, Tambunan and Tenom. The capital of the district is in Nabawan Town.

History 
The district is formerly known as Pensiangan District before been renamed into Nabawan District in 2004. The history of the district administration began in 1957. That year, the district got its own district office in Pensiangan, about 114 kilometres south of Nabawan. Since there were no roads in this area, the transport can only be reached by boat or with horse. The district officers stationed in Pensiangan were therefore equipped with horses to perform their duties. The telephone connection to the outside world was an electroless cable laid along the footpath from Keningau to Pensiangan, to which telephones could be attached if required. The first district officer in early 1957 was I.C. Peck. In the spring of 1974, the administration of the Nabawan District Office was transferred to a newly established office. The Nabawan Scheme, a relocation plan by the United Sabah National Organisation (USNO) was trying to lure new settlers into the area. The plan was not very successful as it was poorly organised with many settlers did not stay longer and returned as they faced challenge to developing the area in addition to the strong traditional views held by the native people in the area.

Demographics 

According to the last census in 2018, the population of Nabawan district is 52,807 and almost exclusively consists of Murut and Lun Bawang/Lundayeh. The population is divided among the larger communities and the total area of the district as follows:

Gallery

See also 
 Districts of Malaysia

References

Further reading

External links 

  Nabawan District Council
  Nabawan District Office